The New Jersey Coastal Heritage Trail Route extends along eastern and southern coast of  New Jersey for nearly 300 miles. It travels along the Raritan Bay from Perth Amboy to Sandy Hook,  along Jersey Shore at the Atlantic Ocean to Cape May, and along the Delaware Bay to the Delaware Memorial Bridge. The trail encompasses a variety of New Jersey state parks along with facilities under the jurisdiction of the National Park Service.

Regions

Raritan Bayshore Sandy Hook Region
Middlesex County 
 Cheesequake State Park
 Perth Amboy Harbor Walk
Monmouth County 
 Allaire State Park
 Belford Seafood CO-OP
 Leonardo State Marina
 Mount Mitchell Scenic Overlook
 Twin Lights State Historic Site
 Sandy Hook, Gateway National Recreation Area
 Sea Bright–Monmouth Beach Seawall
 Steamboat Dock Museum

Barnegat Bay Region
Ocean County 
 Barnegat Bay Decoy & Baymen's Museum
 Barnegat Lighthouse State Park
 Cattus Island Park
 Double Trouble State Park
 Eno's Pond County Park
 Forked River State Marina
 Great Bay Boulevard WMA
 Island Beach State Park
 Toms River Seaport Society Museum
 U.S. Coast Guard Station, Barnegat Light

Absecon Region
Atlantic County 
 Edwin B. Forsythe National Wildlife Refuge
 Senator Frank S. Farley State Marina
 U.S. Coast Guard Station, Atlantic City
Cape May County
 Cape May Point State Park
 Corson's Inlet State Park
 Cape May Migratory Bird Refuge (The Nature Conservancy's William D. & Jane C. Blair Jr.)
 The Wetlands Institute
 Higbee Beach Wildlife Management Area
 Tuckahoe Wildlife Management Area

External links
National Park Service site
New Jersey Coastal Heritage Trail Route map

Tourist attractions in Atlantic County, New Jersey
Tourist attractions in Cape May County, New Jersey
Tourist attractions in Cumberland County, New Jersey
Tourist attractions in Middlesex County, New Jersey
Tourist attractions in Monmouth County, New Jersey
Tourist attractions in Ocean County, New Jersey
Tourist attractions in Salem County, New Jersey
Heritage trails